Islamic rule in South Asia brought with it the use of domes constructed with stone, brick and mortar, and iron dowels and cramps. Centering was made from timber and bamboo. The use of iron cramps to join together adjacent stones was known in pre-Islamic India, and was used at the base of domes for hoop reinforcement. The synthesis of styles created by this introduction of new forms to the Hindu tradition of trabeate construction created a distinctive architecture.

Domes in pre-Mughal India have a standard squat circular shape with a lotus design and bulbous finial at the top, derived from Hindu architecture. Because the Hindu architectural tradition did not include arches extensively, flat corbels were used to transition from the corners of the room to the dome, rather than squinches. In contrast to Persian and Ottoman domes, the domes of Indian tombs tend to be more bulbous.

Medieval period 

The earliest examples include the half-domes of the late 13th century tomb of Balban and the small dome of the tomb of Khan Shahid, which were made of roughly cut material and would have needed covering surface finishes. The Alai Dawarza, a gate in the Qutb complex built in 1311, has the first dome in India made of finely dressed stone cut into voussoir blocks. Arches transition a square chamber to an octagon, which transitions to a sixteen-sided polygon through the use of corbelled brackets. The cut stone dome over the tomb of Ghiyath al-Din Tughluq (d. 1325) uses alternating rings of shallow and deep stones to produce a better bond with the core material. The use of finely cut stone voussoirs for these domes suggest the migration of masons from the former Seljuk Empire.

Domes from the late 14th century use roughly shaped stones covered in render, due to the dispersal of skilled masons following the movement of the capital from Delhi to Daulatabad and back again. Examples include the Khirki Masjid (c. 1375) and the tomb of Firoz Shah (d. 1388). The domed tomb of Khan-i-Jahan Tilangani (1368) is generally referred to as "the first octagonal tomb in Delhi with the domed central chamber surrounded by an ambulatory verandah with three arched openings on each facet", although it is predated by the tomb of Zafar Khan.

Under the Lodi dynasty there was a large proliferation of tomb building, with octagonal plans reserved for royalty and square plans used for others of high rank, and the first double dome was introduced to India in this period. There are multiple candidates. The tomb of Sikander Lodi was built from 1517 to 1518 and is cited, but is predated by the brick tomb of Zain-ul-Abidin's mother, built around 1465 in Zaina Kadal, Srinagar. The Sabz Burj in Delhi may be earlier still, but is dated to 1530-40 by written sources. Although the tomb of Sikander Loki clearly has a double dome, with a distinct space between inner and outer shells, the earlier tomb of Shihab-ud-din Taj Khan (1501) has "an attempt in this direction". Although double domes had long been used in Persia, Iraq, and western Asia, Indian domes prior to this time domes had a single shell of stonework. Afterward, most of the large domes were built with two shells in order to preserve good proportions in both the interior and exterior.

According to Anna Suvorova, author of Muslim Saints in South Asia: The Eleventh to Fifteenth Centuries:  The domed cupola design of Data Durbar is typical of the pre-Mughal Muslim architecture of South Asia: while erecting the cupolas topping a square building, an intermediate form of squinches or arched transitional supports was used. These squinches are the arches built diagonally across the corners of a square to create this transition from the square to the spherical base of the dome. However, the technique of erecting domes on squinches did not prove strong enough when the domes were excessively high or had too large a radius: such structures could not withstand natural calamities.

The Makli Necropolis, near Thatta, Sindh province is described in the Oxford Handbook of the Archaeology of Death and Burial as: The most common form of Muslim funerary monument is a square cube-like building covered with a dome. The origin of this architectural form is a matter of debate, though it may relate either to pre-Islamic Iranian or to Byzantine forms. There are a vast number of variations on this basic theme, including tall honeycomb-like domes seen in Iraq (e.g. Sitt Zubayda), polygonal tent-shaped domes in Turkey and Iran, and bulbous domes, as seen in India and South Asia. ... One of the largest collections of mausolea is located in the Makli hills near Thatta in And province, Pakistan, in a vast cemetery with a circumference of 8 kilometres. Many of these medieval mausolea are decorated with Islamic and Hindu motifs, whilst the later mausolea resemble the domed constructions of Central Asia.

Early modern period
The first major Mughal building is the domed tomb of Humayun, built between 1562 and 1571 by a Persian architect. The central dome likely has a core of brick, as can be seen in the later stripped tomb of Khan-i-Khanan. The central dome is faced with marble blocks in attached to the core by alternating wide and narrow layers and there is evidence of the use of iron cramps to secure them. Iron cramps may also help form a tension ring at the base of the dome. The central double dome covers an octagonal central chamber about 15 meters wide and is accompanied by small domed chattri made of brick and faced with stone. Smaller domes were widely made with rectangular bricks beginning in the 16th century, the necessary curvature being created by tapering the mortar joints. Chatris, the domed kiosks on pillars characteristic of Mughal roofs, were adopted from their Hindu use as cenotaphs.

The Taj Mahal in Agra, also a brick structure clad primarily in marble, was begun in 1632 and mostly completed in 1636; the rest of the extensive complex would not be finished before 1643. The tomb was built for Mumtaz Mahal, a wife of emperor Shah Jahan, after her death in 1631. The central double dome covers a diameter of 22 meters. The inner dome is three meters thick and over 30 meters below the outer dome. The outer dome rests upon drum walls five metes thick. The fusion of Persian and Indian architecture can be seen in the dome's shape: the bulbous shape derives from Persian Timurid domes, and the finial with lotus leaf base is derived from Hindu temples. The inner dome has a decorative triangulated pattern modeled after plaster mold work, but here carved in marble. The entire complex is highly symmetrical. On the western side of the tomb is a red sandstone mosque with three bulbous domes faced with marble, and on the eastern side is mirror-image assembly hall that likewise has three marble domes. At the center of the tomb hall lies the cenotaph of Mumtaz Mahal, with her husband's off-center to the west. The actual sarcophagi lie directly below, in the crypt, but in the same arrangement.

The last major Islamic tomb built in India was the tomb of Safdar Jang (1753–54). It is a brick structure clad in sandstone and marble stripped from the earlier tomb of Khan-i-Khanan (d. 1627). Shallow brick domes cover the perimeter chambers of the building, and the central dome is reportedly triple-shelled, with two relatively flat inner brick domes and an outer bulbous marble dome, although it may actually be that the marble and second brick domes are joined everywhere but under the lotus leaf finial at the top.

The tomb of Mohammed Adil Shah (d. 1656) in Bijapur is one of the largest masonry domes in the world. Called the Gol Gumbaz, or Round Dome, it has an internal diameter of 41.15 meters and a height of 54.25 meters. The dome was built with layers of brick between thick layers of mortar and rendered on both faces, so that the dome acts as a concrete shell reinforced with bricks. It is 2.6 meters thick at the base. The dome was the most technically advanced to be built in the Deccan, and exemplifies the flowering of art and architecture that occurred during the period of the Adil Shahi Sultanate's greatest extent. Radial cracks were repaired in 1936-7 by the application of reinforcement to the outside of the dome, which was then covered by sprayed concrete. Both the Gol Gumbaz dome and the smaller dome of the Jama Masjid, a 57-foot wide dome also at Bijapur, are above distinctive transition zones consisting of eight intersecting arches that narrow the openings to be covered.

The Badshahi Mosque, one of the jewels of Mughal architecture, and South Asia's second-largest mosque, built by Aurengzeb between 1671 and 1673, is describes by historian Catherine B. Asher as:  The prayer chamber adheres generally to the plan of Shah Jahan's Delhi mosque constructed about two decades earlier, although it is considerably larger. While closely modeled on Shah Jahan-period congregational mosques, the Badshahi mosque reveals a greater sense of spatial tension in keeping with the new aesthetic established early in Aurangzeb's reign. This is achieved, in part, by the sheer scale of the complex and by the facade's arched openings that are small in comparison to the building's overall massive size. Further underscoring this spatial tension are the bulbous domes and the minarets at the compound corners that emphasize the sense of verticality.

Domes appear frequently in Sikh architecture, which was greatly influenced by Mughal architecture. Most of Historical Sikh buildings were built towards the end of 18th century. Domes in Sikh architecture are mostly ribbed with lotus design at the top and floral motifs at the bottom. These domes start with wide base and reach maximum circumference when they are less than halfway up.

Later modern period

After the fall of the Mughal Empire, a new form of revivalist architecture developed under the British, known as Indo-Saracenic architecture. It draws heavily from Mughal and Rajput architectural forms, and extensively used domes.

References

Bibliography 

Domes
Arches and vaults
Architectural elements
Church architecture
Mosque architecture
Ceilings
Roofs
Pakistani architectural history
Indian architectural history